Browns Mills is an unincorporated community and census-designated place (CDP) located in Pemberton Township, in Burlington County, in the U.S. state of New Jersey. As of the 2020 United States census the CDP's population was 10,734, a decrease of 489 (-4.4%) from the 11,223 counted at the 2010 United States census, which in turn reflected a decrease of 34 (-0.3%) from the 2000 census. Browns Mills is known as the home of Deborah Heart and Lung Center.

Geography

According to the United States Census Bureau, Browns Mills had a total area of 5.612 square miles (14.534 km2), including 5.367 square miles (13.900 km2) of land and 0.245 square miles (0.634 km2) of water (4.36%).

Demographics

2010 census

2000 census
As of the 2000 United States census there were 11,257 people, 3,946 households, and 2,939 families living in the CDP. The population density was 799.0/km2 (2,070.8/mi2). There were 4,245 housing units at an average density of 301.3/km2 (780.9/mi2). The racial makeup of the CDP was 64.50% White, 22.81% African American, 0.50% Native American, 3.72% Asian, 0.07% Pacific Islander, 3.13% from other races, and 5.27% from two or more races. Hispanic or Latino of any race were 9.35% of the population.

There were 3,946 households, out of which 40.1% had children under the age of 18 living with them, 49.0% were married couples living together, 19.2% had a female householder with no husband present, and 25.5% were non-families. 20.3% of all households were made up of individuals, and 5.7% had someone living alone who was 65 years of age or older. The average household size was 2.84 and the average family size was 3.24.

In the CDP the population was spread out, with 29.3% under the age of 18, 9.2% from 18 to 24, 31.6% from 25 to 44, 21.6% from 45 to 64, and 8.4% who were 65 years of age or older. The median age was 34 years. For every 100 females, there were 91.4 males. For every 100 females age 18 and over, there were 88.6 males.

The median income for a household in the CDP was $45,008, and the median income for a family was $49,443. Males had a median income of $36,160 versus $25,239 for females. The per capita income for the CDP was $17,678. About 7.3% of families and 11.0% of the population were below the poverty line, including 13.7% of those under age 18 and 7.5% of those age 65 or over.

Transportation
 NJ Transit provides bus service to and from Philadelphia on the 317 route.

Notable people

People who were born in, residents of, or otherwise closely associated with Browns Mills include:
 Beetlejuice (born 1968), entertainer known for his appearances on the Howard Stern Show.
 Matthew Emmons (born 1981), sharpshooter who won an Olympic gold medal at the 2004 Summer Olympics in the Men's 50 m Rifle Prone.
 Ed Forchion (born 1964), cannabis activist known as NJWEEDMAN and a perennial candidate for various New Jersey elected offices.
 Ed Gillespie (born 1961), former chairman or the Republican Party, senior advisor to Mitt Romney.

References

Census-designated places in Burlington County, New Jersey
Pemberton Township, New Jersey
Populated places in the Pine Barrens (New Jersey)